Pieter Godfried Bertichen (5 February 1796 – 1856) was a Dutch painter and lithographer who also lived and worked in Brazil.

Bertichen was born in Amsterdam and initially trained by Jurriaan Andriessen and worked there, until in 1833 he moved to Rio de Janeiro where he continued to live and work. He primarily painted and printed depictions of buildings and landscapes. He traveled around Brazil, and eventually settled in Petrópolis where he died in 1856.

References

1796 births
1856 deaths
19th-century Dutch painters
Dutch male painters
Painters from Amsterdam
19th-century Dutch male artists